Candidplatz is an U-Bahn station in Munich on the U1 line of the Munich U-Bahn system. The station is named for the Flemish mannerist painter Peter Candid, who entered employ in Munich in 1586, producing notable artworks for the Munich Residenz. The station is notable for the decorative scheme applied to the outer walls, which evoke a rainbow.

See also
List of Munich U-Bahn stations

References

Munich U-Bahn stations
Railway stations in Germany opened in 1997